Salakati railway station serves the town of Salakati, Kokrajhar district in the Indian state of Assam.
The station code is SLKX and lies on the New Jalpaiguri–New Bongaigaon section of Barauni–Guwahati line under Northeast Frontier Railway. This station falls under Alipurduar railway division.

References

Railway stations in Kokrajhar district
Alipurduar railway division